Kjell Risvik (29 June 1941 – 28 March 2021) was a translator of literature into Norwegian from various languages, including Catalan, English, French, German, Hebrew, Italian, Portuguese and Spanish.

He was awarded the Brage Honorary Prize in 2006, along with his wife Kari Risvik.

References

1941 births
2021 deaths
Norwegian male writers
Norwegian translators
Translators from Catalan
English–Norwegian translators
French–Norwegian translators
Translators from German
Translators from Hebrew
Translators from Italian
Translators from Portuguese
Translators from Spanish
Translators to Norwegian